Thüngersheim is a community located in Germany. The community is situated on the River Main. It is a community in the district of Würzburg (Bavaria, Administrative region Lower Franconia).

Coat of arms
The coat of arms shows the local patron St. Michael. It was conferred on the village in 1581 by Julius Echter of Mespelbrunn, then Bishop of Würzburg.

Geography

Geographic data
This makes the Main valley one of the driest regions of Germany.

Neighbouring communities
Thüngersheim has common borders with Retzbach in the north, Retzstadt in the northeast, Güntersleben in the east, Veitshöchheim in the west and Zellingen and Erlabrunn (both separated from Thüngersheim by the river Main).

History
 Formation of the village during the first phase of franconian settlement between 530 and 700 A.C.
 1098: Thüngersheim is documented for the first time.
 1154: The first vine is planted.
 1614: Completion of the parish church St. Michael
 1713: Georg Anton Urlaub is born in Thüngersheim.
 1803: Thüngersheim belongs to the grand duchy of Ferdinand von Toskana (as part of the principality Würzburg).
 1814: The grand duchy of Würzburg (to which Thüngersheim belongs) becomes part of Bavaria.
 1870: A station and a railroad control center are built. Vine trade is shifted from the main to the railroad.
 1930: Foundation of the vinegrowers co-operative by 55 local vinters.
 1933: The barrage Erlabrunn is built.
 1945: On March 16 the out-sourced municipal archive is destroyed during the bombing of Würzburg.
 1966: The majority of the vinters agrees on the land consolidation, 2.2 square kilometres of vineyards.
 1998: "900 years" celebration

Religion

Denominations
Thüngersheim is predominantly Catholic (parish church St. Michael).
In 2003 a parish community was formed with St. Maternus Güntersleben.

Pilgrimage to the Kreuzberg (Cross Mountain) 
A prominent religious event is the pilgrimage to the Kreuzberg. It is undertaken once a year. The destination is the Kreuzberg in the Rhön, which is also called the holy mountain of the Franconians. It dates back to the 18th century.

Politics

Municipal council
The municipal council consists of 14 members (plus the mayor). Seven members belong to the free voters community, five to the Christian Social Union (CSU), and two to the Social Democratic Party (SPD).

Town twinning
Thüngersheim is twinned to St. Aignan de Grand Lieu (France).

Population development
1939: 1,753
1950: 2,345
1961: 2,270
1970: 2,432
1987: 2,453
1993: 2,505
1994: 2,567
1995: 2,596
1996: 2,615
1996: female 1,300, male 1,315

Culture and sights

Buildings
The parish church St. Michael is worth seeing (literature - in German - is referenced below). Three of the once four gate lodges are still present. They were part of the fortification (a ring of walls surrounding the town centre).

Associations
(all the information is in German)
Gesangverein
Musikverein

Libraries
Municipal library located in the former town hall and Catholic public library.

Businesses and infrastructure
Thüngersheim is the domicile of the Winzergenossenschaft Thüngersheim eG (vinters' co-operative) founded in 1930.

Transport
Thüngersheim is located at the Bundesstraße (federal road) 27 and on the railroad line Würzburg-Gemünden.

Education
The only school is the elementary school (first to fourth grade).

Recreation facilities
 Outdoor swimming pool
 Gymnasium
 Sports stadium (soccer, tennis, handball)

Notable people
 Georg Anton Urlaub, Baroque painter, a staff member of Giovanni Battista Tiepolo
 Georg Sebastian Urlaub, Baroque painter

Literature
(all the literature is in German)
  Johann Valentin Hart: Main, Wein, Thüngersheim. 1933.
  Richard Glaab: Thüngersheim - Gegenwart und Vergangenheit einer mainfränkischen Winzergemeinde. Thüngersheim, Gde. (Hrsg.), 1982.
  Adam Oechsner: Die Mundart von Thüngersheim. Würzburg, Univ., Diss., 1920.
  August Zeyer: Schöa worsch - Der Thüngersheimer August Zeyer erzählt in Mundart und Prosa aus seinem Leben. Selbstverlag, Thüngersheim, 1989.
  St. Michael Thüngersheim, Schnell Kunstführer Nr. 1565. Schnell und Steiner, München, 11986.
  Christine Brandl: Vom Härwest bis Foosenocht
  Wolfgang Brückner: Die Wallfahrt zum Kreuzberg in der Rhön. Echter, Würzburg, 1997.
  Gemeinde Thüngersheim (Hrsg.): Thüngersheim - Ein Winzerort in Mainfranken. Vorbereitende Untersuchungen zur Ortsanierung nach Baugesetzbuch, Bericht 1 (30. November 2000)

References

External links
(all the pages in German)
Official website
Winzergenossenschaft Thüngersheim
Gesangverein Thüngersheim
Musikverein Thüngersheim
Schützenverein Thüngersheim
Fußballverein Thüngersheim (Seite befindet sich im Aufbau)

Würzburg (district)